The Newton Street Railway Carbarn is an historic building located at 1121 Washington Street in the village of West Newton in Newton, Massachusetts.  Built in 1890 by the Newton Street Railway Company, it is a rare surviving example of a wood-frame trolley car garage facility, a facility once common in areas served by electrified trolleys.  The building has a long two-story central section with extended single-story wings.   It has been extensively remodeled and modernized and is now a commercial building with a restaurant, grocery store, and offices.

On September 4, 1986, it was added to the National Register of Historic Places.

See also
 National Register of Historic Places listings in Newton, Massachusetts

References

National Register of Historic Places in Newton, Massachusetts
Industrial buildings and structures on the National Register of Historic Places in Massachusetts
Transport infrastructure completed in 1890
Buildings and structures in Newton, Massachusetts
Streetcars in the Boston area